British Sikhs number over 520,000 people and account for 0.88% of England and Wales's population as of 2021, forming the United Kingdom's fourth-largest religious group.  According to the 2021 United Kingdom census, Sikhs in England & Wales numbered 524,140, with 520,092 in England and 4,048 in Wales. The largest Sikh populations in the U.K. are in the West Midlands and Greater London.

History

Sikhs and Britain have a long and storied history. Decades before the last Sikh King, Duleep Singh, stepped onto British soil in the middle of the 19th century, there had been Anglo-Sikh contact as far back as the 1800s in the Punjab with his father Maharaja Ranjit Singh. Since then, even though this relationship has changed in nature many times, both communities have left a strong permanent influence on each other. For instance, in such varied parts of British society as food, language, political systems, soldiering and of course cricket, the British-Sikh relationship has given rise to many new facets of modern British and Indian society.

The first permanent Sikh in Britain was Maharaja Duleep Singh (1838-1893), the last Sikh Emperor of the Imperial Sukerchakia Dynasty, from 1844 to 1849. He arrived in England in the year 1854, having been exiled from his kingdom by the East India Company. His mother, Empress Jind Kaur (1817-1863), arrived in 1860 at Kensington in Victorian London and settled permanently, after being at war with Britain for an extended period of time until the fall of the Sikh Dynasty in 1849. She was given permission by Parliament to settle on English soil.

The First Sikh Settlers started migrating from the Punjab in 1911, when the first Sikh Gurdwara was opened in London. During the start of the First and Second World Wars respectively, there was already an established Sikh presence in many parts of England. Britain’s first south Asian immigrants after the war were Pakistani Muslims and Punjabi Sikhs from the Jullundur Doab. They tended to settle in midland towns such as Birmingham and Leeds, as well as in the London borough of Southall. 

In 2019, Seema Malhotra MP set up the first debate in Parliament to discuss the positive contribution of the Sikh community over the last 70 years. 

Despite the existence of advocacy organisations like the British Sikh Report, there is very little systematic research on British Sikhs. The only major academic work that is comprehensive, systematic and a through history of the community is by Gurharpal Singh and Darshan S. Tatla, Sikhs in Britain: The Making of a Community (Zed, 2006). This work needs updating in light of the impending Census 2021 to reflect changes in the community's profile.

Demography

Politics

Incumbent Sikh Lords include four Conservatives (Baron Rana of Malone in Antrim, Baroness Verma of Leicester, Baron Suri of Ealing, and Baron Ranger of Mayfair), one crossbencher (Baron Singh of Wimbledon) and  one Labour member (Baron Sahota of Telford). Both incumbent Sikh MPs are from the Labour party (Tanmanjeet Singh Dhesi of Slough and Preet Gill of Birmingham Edgbaston). The first Sikh MP was Piara Singh Khabra of Ealing Southall and the first Sikh Lord was Baron King of West Bromwich.

Education 
65% percent of British Sikhs have a graduate level qualification or above. Sikhs in the 20 - 34 age group have the highest level of graduates (55%) within the Sikh community. The highest level of postgraduate qualifications of Master’s degrees (22%) is in the 35 - 49 age group. Eight percent of Sikhs aged 65 and over 
have a PhD. The split of formal education between women and men is roughly equal, with slightly more women holding a university degree or equivalent (48% of women, 42% of men).

Employment 
The most popular employment sectors for British Sikhs include: Healthcare (10%), IT and Technology (8%), Teaching and Education (9%), Accountancy and Financial Management (7%), indicating that Sikhs tend to favour professional and technical employment sectors over others. Healthcare is a popular sector for all age groups. Teaching and Education is more common in the 35 - 49 and the 50 - 64 age groups than others, whereas accountancy and financial management is more popular with the 20 - 34 age group (9%) compared with 6% respectively for both the 35 - 49 and the 50 - 64 age groups. The top career choices for Sikh women are Healthcare (14%) and Teaching and Education (15%). Healthcare is also a joint second most popular choice for Sikh men along with Accountancy and Financial Management, the most popular sector being IT and Technology (13%).

Wealth

Home ownership 
Home ownership is very high amongst British Sikhs with 87% of households owning at least a portion of their home. Thirty percent of British Sikh households own their homes outright and only 9% rent their properties. Only 1% of British Sikhs claim Housing Benefit. This represents the highest level of private home ownership rate over any other community in the UK. In addition, half of all British Sikh families (49%) own more than one property in the UK, with a similar number (50%) owning at least one property in India, apparently indicating that property ownership is used as a top means of building assets for the future. 6% of British Sikhs own property elsewhere in Europe.

Income 
Relative to the national average income at approximately £40,000 before tax (according to the British Sikh Report), it found that Sikh households tend to be affluent. Two in every three British Sikh households (66%) have pre-tax incomes in excess of £40,000, and over a third (34%) have an income in excess of £80,000, giving a value for the Sikh Pound of 7.63 billion. 

However this data appears to be contradicted by research carried out by the Joseph Rowntree Foundation, which actually states Sikhs have the second highest poverty rate in the UK, with 27% of British Sikhs living below the poverty line; this is in comparison to 18% of the population as a whole.

About one in three British Sikh families (34%) own a business in the UK.

Charitable giving and volunteering 

Performing Seva (selfless service) is a basic tenet of Sikhism, and Sikhs are also expected to share at least 10 per cent their earnings with those less fortunate and for good causes (Dasvandh).

Sixty-four percent of British Sikhs engage in some volunteering work, and 40% give between one and five hours per week on voluntary activities, including Seva at their Gurdwara, whilst more than 2% spend over 25 hours on such activities, spending about on average 200 hours per year on voluntary activities. Ninety-three percent claim to donate some money to charity every month, with 50% donating between £1 and £20 every month, and 7% donating more than £100 per month. It is estimated that Sikhs in Britain donate around £380 per year to charity on average. Taken as a whole, Sikhs in the UK are estimated to donate about £125 million to charity per annum and spend over 65 million hours each year on voluntary activities.

Care of the elderly 
Sikhs prefer to live in extended family households as they grow older - 61% of males and 52% of females. The second highest preference is in their own home (44% males and 41% females) and the third preference is in a retirement village  (31% females and 24% males).

Geographical distribution 

British Sikhs have been praised as an example of positive cultural integration in the United Kingdom, many having achieved success due to a strong cultural work ethic combined with an emphasis on the importance of the family.

According to the 2017 British Sikh Report which surveys the community in the UK, 71% were born in England, followed by 15% in India, 8% in East Africa, 2% in Scotland, and 1% in Afghanistan.

According to the 2021 United Kingdom census, Sikhs in England & Wales enumerated 524,140, or 0.9% of the population

West Midlands
West Midlands has the highest Sikh population and Sikh proportion of any English region, with 172,398 Sikhs making up 2.9% of the region's population at the 2021 census. The five West Midlands local authorities with the highest Sikh population are Sandwell (39,252), Birmingham (33,126), Wolverhampton (31,769), Coventry (17,297), and Walsall (17,148). The five West Midlands local authorities with the highest Sikh proportion are Wolverhampton (12.0%), Sandwell (11.5%), Walsall (6.0%), Coventry (5.0%), and Warwick (4.2%). The Black Country is home to 93,485 Sikhs and is 7.7% Sikh.

Sandwell 
Sandwell has a large Sikh community numbering 39,252 at the 2021 census (the largest of any local authority in England) and making up 11.5% of the area's population (the second-largest proportion of any local authority in England). The majority live in West Bromwich and Smethwick. Sandwell’s first gurdwara was built in Smethwick, and is the largest outside of London.

Birmingham 

Birmingham has a large Sikh community numbering 33,126 at the 2021 census (the second-largest of any local authority in England) and making up 2.9% of the city's population. In 2021, Sikhs were the second-largest religious group in Handsworth, where they numbered 5,064 and made up 24.8% of the population.

Wolverhampton 
Wolverhampton has a large Sikh community numbering 31,769 at the 2021 census (the third-largest of any local authority in England) and making up 12.0% of the city's population (the largest proportion of any local authority in England). Blakenhall, in Wolverhampton, was home to 5,131 Sikhs in 2021 and had a 40.7% Sikh plurality.

London 

With 144,543 Sikhs living in London at the 2021 census (1.6% of London's population), the area is home to the second-largest Sikh community in the UK. The five London boroughs with the highest Sikh population are Ealing (28,491), Hillingdon (26,339), Hounslow (24,677), Redbridge (17,622), and Newham (5,638). The five London boroughs with the highest Sikh proportion are Hillingdon (8.6%), Hounslow (8.6%), Ealing (7.8%), Redbridge (5.7%), and Bexley (2.1%).

Ealing
The area of Southall in Ealing, also known as "Little Punjab", was home to 20,843 Sikhs at the 2021 census and had a 28.2% Sikh plurality.

Hounslow
Heston, in Hounslow, was home to 10,692 Sikhs in 2021 and had a 25.8% Sikh plurality.

South East
With 74,348 Sikhs living in the South East at the 2021 census (0.8% of the region's population), the area is home to the third-largest Sikh community in the UK. The five South East local authorities with the highest Sikh population are Slough (17,985), Gravesham (8,560), Medway (4,363), Southampton (4,192), and Wokingham (2,992). The five South East local authorities with the highest Sikh proportion are Slough (11.3%), Gravesham (8.0%), Windsor and Maidenhead (2.9%), Spelthorne (2.5%), and Southampton (1.7%).

East Midlands
With 53,950 Sikhs living in the East Midlands at the 2021 census (1.1% of the region's population), the area is home to the fourth-largest Sikh community in the UK. The five East Midlands local authorities with the highest Sikh population are Leicester (16,451), Derby (9,762), Oadby and Wigston (4,342), Nottingham (4,110), and Blaby (2,927). The five East Midlands local authorities with the highest Sikh proportion are Oadby and Wigston (7.5%), Leicester (4.5%), Derby (3.7%), Blaby (2.8%), and South Derbyshire (2.1%).

Festivals and community events 

Some of the bigger festival celebrations within the British Sikh community include Vaisakhi which usually involves colourful street processions throughout the country and Diwali. Southall hosts one of the largest Vaisakhi street processions in Europe. Since 2009, both Vaisakhi and Diwali have been celebrated every year at 10 Downing Street, the residence of the British Prime Minister.

Exemptions in British law for Sikhs 
Sikhs are exempt from a few British laws on account of religious reasons. For example, men wearing a Dastar (turban) may ride a motorcycle without a helmet, and are permitted to wear their Kirpan as religious dress rather than offensive weapon in certain situations. In February 2010, Sir Mota Singh, Britain's first Asian judge, criticised the banning of the Kirpan in public places such as schools. The tenth and final guru, Guru Gobind Singh formally included the Kirpan as a mandatory article of faith for all baptised Sikhs, making it a duty for Sikhs to be able to defend the needy, suppressed ones, to defend righteousness and the freedom of expression.

British converts to Sikhism 

 Alexandra Aitken - actress and daughter of former British cabinet minister Jonathan Aitken
 Vic Briggs - former blues musician, now Vikram Singh Khalsa; became the first non-subcontinental to perform kirtan at Harimandir Sahib
 Max Arthur Macauliffe (1841–1913) - senior administrator of the British Raj who was posted in the Punjab; prolific scholar and author; converted to Sikhism in the 1860s

Discrimination 
In an online survey of 650 Sikhs in the UK, three-quarters of them said they had experienced racism. In spite of this, 95% said they are proud of being born or living in Britain. 43% of the women surveyed said they had experienced discrimination on the basis of gender, and 71% of those had also experienced it within their extended family.

Influential British Sikh organisations 
The Gurdwara remains the focal point of the Sikh community. There are also now a variety of notable organisations which have been setup by Sikhs to support the community:

 British Sikh Report
 Basics of Sikhi
 Gurdwara Sahib Leamington and Warwick
 Guru Nanak Nishkam Sevak Jatha
 Gurdwara Sri Guru Singh Sabha Southall
 Guru Nanak Gurdwara Smethwick
 Guru Nanak Darbar Gurdwara
 Nishkam SWAT
 Sangat TV
 Sikh Pioneers & Sikh Light Infantry Association UK
 Sikh Channel
 Sikh Federation (UK)
 The Sikh Awards

Controversies

Census data 
In 2018, some Sikh organisations requested the ONS to include an ethnic tick box for Sikhs,  creating an ongoing dispute between various Sikh organisations.  The ONS rejected the request. The ONS rejected the demand in their published paper.

Inter-faith marriages 
Holding an Anand Karaj wedding ceremony between a Sikh and a non-Sikh has become a contentious issue. In 2016, armed police arrested scores of protesters at Gurdwara Sahib in Leamington Spa, which The Telegraph claims "has a history of tensions over mixed marriages". Sikh Youth UK, who were behind the protest, blamed "a rogue Gurdwara committee creating discord". 

One Sikh journalist called the issue a "deepening schism" while another expressed dismay at the protesters' use of masks, and the way their actions allowed the kirpan (ceremonial dagger) to be seen as a bladed weapon rather than traditional dress, thus giving "the racists and the bigots justifications for their ignorant hatred". An investigation on BBC Asian Network found that these disruptions over interfaith marriage had been going on for years.

Extremism 
 In 2018, there were various violent incident at Gurdwaras involving Sikhs being attacked for supporting different views.
In 2018, five Sikh homes were raided by Anti-terror police. The reason for the arrests was questioned by MP Preet Gill.
In 2017, a Scottish Sikh named Jagtar Singh Johal was arrested in India for terrorism offences whilst wedding shopping. As of yet he has been held without charge.
In 2016,an interracial couple was terrorised for having a Sikh wedding by gangs of men. 
In 2015, BBC presenter Bobby Friction was pressed by the Sikh Federation to apologise for using the offensive term 'Sikh Taliban' on air.
In 2015, a Sikh Lives Matter demonstration turned violent with at least one police officer injured.
 In 2014, a religious leader of a Sikh sect was attacked by an axe-wielding man. The attacker Harjit Singh Toor was jailed for 17 years.
 In 2012, the Indian general who led the raid on Sikhism's holiest shrine was attacked whilst walking with his wife in London by four men. The attackers were jailed in 2013.
In 2011, a 21-year-old millionaire Sikh executive was murdered in revenge for allegedly seducing a woman. The student who lured him to her apartment and who was jailed for GBH was later released.
In 2004 a play by Gurpreet Kaur Bhatti sparked controversy and its performances were cancelled after violent protests. The play included a scene set in a gurdwara involving rape, physical abuse and murder. Sikhs protested its opening night at the Birmingham Repertory Theatre.

Alleged grooming of Sikh girls by Muslim men
A BBC Inside Out (London) programme televised in September 2013 interviewed several young Sikh women who were allegedly groomed and sexually abused by Muslim men, with one alleged ex-groomer even admitting that they specifically targeted Sikh girls. Bhai Mohan Singh, working for the Sikh Awareness Society (SAS), told the BBC he was investigating 19 alleged cases where Sikh girls were allegedly being groomed by older Muslim men, of which one ended with a successful conviction. 

In August 2013 four Muslims and two Hindus were convicted at Leicester Crown Court of paying a "vulnerable and damaged" 16-year-old Sikh girl for sex, the investigation having been opened due to evidence Bhai Mohan Singh had presented to the police. 

However, a report published the previous year by Faith Matters (which runs the TELL MAMA anti-Muslim violence helpline and works closely with the Jewish Community Security Trust) claimed that the Sikh Awareness Society included radical anti-Muslim elements among its members; Faith Matters furthermore alleged it was a matter of "common consensus" that the radical Sikhs said to have had secret meetings with the English Defence League were members of the SAS. The SAS denied allegations and distanced themselves from the organization, a spokesperson telling Hope not Hate: "We would have nothing to do with any racist or fascist group, certainly one that uses religion to divide people…I know nothing about this and no, we are not in any kind of talks and discussion with them". The Nihal Show on the BBC Asian Network discussed the issue and debated the merits of the grooming claims in September 2013.

In 2018, a report by a Sikh activist organisation, Sikh Youth UK, entitled “The Religiously Aggravated Sexual Exploitation of Young Sikh Women Across the UK" made allegations of similarities between the case of Sikh Women and the Rotherham child sexual exploitation scandal. However in 2019 this report was criticised by researchers and an official UK government report lead by two Sikh academics for false and misleading information. It noted: "The RASE report lacks solid data, methodological transparency and rigour. It is filled instead with sweeping generalisations and poorly substantiated claims around the nature and scale of abuse of Sikh girls and causal factors driving it. It appealed heavily to historical tensions between Sikhs and Muslims and narratives of honour in a way that seemed designed to whip up fear and hate".

Allegations of forced conversions of Sikh girls to Islam 
In 2007, a Sikh girl's family claimed that she had been forcibly converted to Islam, and after being attacked by an armed gang, they received a police guard. In response to these news stories, an open letter to Sir Ian Blair signed by ten academics argued that claims that Hindu and Sikh girls were being forcefully converted were "part of an arsenal of myths propagated by right-wing Hindu supremacist organisations in India". The Muslim Council of Britain issued a press release pointing out there was a lack of evidence of any forced conversions and suggested it was an underhand attempt to smear the British Muslim population.

An academic paper by Katy Sian published in the journal South Asian Popular Culture in 2011 explored the question of how "forced conversion narratives" arose around the Sikh diaspora in the United Kingdom. Sian, who reports that claims of conversion through courtship on campuses are widespread in the UK, says that rather than relying on actual evidence they primarily rest on the word of "a friend of a friend" or on personal anecdote. According to Sian, the narrative is similar to accusations of "white slavery" lodged against the Jewish community and foreigners to the UK and the US, with the former having ties to anti-semitism that mirror the Islamophobia betrayed by the modern narrative. Sian expanded on these views in 2013's Mistaken Identities, Forced Conversions, and Postcolonial Formations.

See also 

List of British Sikhs
Sikhism in England
Sikhism in Northern Ireland
Sikhism in Scotland
Sikhism in Wales
British Indians
British Punjabis
British Sikh Report
Sikhism by country
 Sikhism in Australia
 Sikhism in Canada
 Sikhism in the United States
 Sikhism in New Zealand

References

Further reading
Sikhs in Britain: the making of a community  (Zed, 2006) by Prof. Gurharpal Singh and Dr. Darshan Singh Tatla.

External links
Reassessing what we collect website – Sikh London History of Sikh London with objects and images

 
Indian diaspora in the United Kingdom